Spilt Sauce is the sixth EP released by You Am I, on 22 April 2016. This limited edition 7-inch EP is a collection of three studio outtakes from the band's recording session for the album "Porridge & Hotsauce". It was released at the same time as a red vinyl edition of Porridge and Hotsauce.

Track listing 
All songs: Rogers/You Am I

 "Aubade"
 "Til It Was My Tyme"
 "Airport Lounge"

Personnel
 Tim Rogers - vocals, guitar
 David Lane - guitar
 Andy Kent - bass guitar, backing vocals
 Rusty Hopkinson - drums

References 

2016 EPs
You Am I albums